In algebraic geometry, the Kempf vanishing theorem, introduced by , states that the higher cohomology group Hi(G/B,L(λ)) (i > 0) vanishes whenever λ is a dominant weight of B.  Here G is a reductive algebraic group over an algebraically closed field, B a Borel subgroup, and L(λ) a line bundle associated to λ. In characteristic 0 this is a special case of the Borel–Weil–Bott theorem, but unlike the Borel–Weil–Bott theorem, the Kempf vanishing theorem still holds in positive characteristic.

 and  found simpler proofs of the Kempf vanishing theorem using the Frobenius morphism.

References

Algebraic groups
Theorems in algebraic geometry